Mario & Luigi is a series of role-playing video games developed by AlphaDream and published by Nintendo for the latter's various video game handheld consoles. The series is a spin-off from Nintendo's trademark Super Mario series, and stars the titular characters Mario and Luigi. The games' stories follow the two on a quest to defeat an antagonist, primarily Bowser. It began in 2003 on the Game Boy Advance with Mario & Luigi: Superstar Saga, with the latest original installment being Mario & Luigi: Paper Jam in 2015 for the Nintendo 3DS. Two other titles in the series, including Superstar Saga, had an additional remake for the Nintendo 3DS. Mario & Luigi: Bowser's Inside Story + Bowser Jr.'s Journey was the last game in the series before AlphaDream declared bankruptcy in 2019, and remains the latest installment in the series.

Gameplay 

The Gameplay of the Mario & Luigi series consists of majority Role-Playing Gameplay, although the Mario & Luigi games do differ from most other RPGs due to its focus on controlling Mario and Luigi simultaneously. During overworld sections, the directional pad (or control stick in the 3DS games) controls Mario's movement with Luigi following closely (Paper Mario also, in Paper Jam), while Mario and Luigi's other actions are controlled individually with the A (Mario) and B (Luigi) buttons respectively. Like many other RPG series' the Mario & Luigi series contains a battle system, it uses Action Commands, similarly to the Paper Mario franchise. These actions consist of Mario & Luigi's signature Jump, and also returning from Mario's first venture into the Role-Playing genre, Mario RPG is the hammer.

Development

2000–2003: AlphaDream founding, conception and first game 

AlphaDream was founded in 2000 by former employees from Square including Chihiro Fujioka, director of Super Mario RPG, and Tetsuo Mizuno, Square's second president. Square had previously developed Super Mario RPG, the first role-playing game (RPG) starring characters from the Mario series. After a number of smaller games, Mario & Luigi: Superstar Saga was their first game to be released outside of Japan.

The Mario & Luigi series took inspiration from Super Mario RPG when it came to turn-based combat. Yoshihiko Maekawa, a producer at AlphaDream who also co-directed Super Mario RPG, noted how the latter was inspired by a children's toy in Japan where the player had to press buttons in time with music. From there he conceptualized turn-based mechanics that blended action with general RPG gameplay, where the player had to make timed button presses to be more successful. It was there the developers knew they were creating an RPG game that had a Mario feel. Transitioning to the Mario & Luigi series, AlphaDream revisited the timed button pressing combat system, making additions for the first game in the series, Mario & Luigi: Superstar Saga. Each game following, they experimented more with the buttons available, making further additions as the series progressed.

When it came to characters in Mario franchise at the time, they were generally underdeveloped. Since Mario & Luigi is mainly based on a text-based story, AlphaDream approached Nintendo with the mindset of revamping characters such as Luigi. With Nintendo's approval and support, the characters and their depth were developed from scratch.

2004–2009: Nintendo DS era 
Nintendo revealed Mario & Luigi: Partners in Time at E3 2005, where a playable demonstration of the game was available. The demos consisted of three levels, each accompanied with a tutorial to guide the player. Each level had a different objective and represented the characters' abilities in the game, such as the use of the hammer. Between the game's unveiling at E3 and its release, Nintendo of America revealed details of the game relating to Partners in Times plot and gameplay, as well as the fact that it would be compatible with the "Rumble Pak" feature. Partners in Time was first released in North America on November 28, 2005. Mario & Luigi: Bowser's Inside Story was revealed to be in development in October 2008 in Japan at Nintendo's Tokyo Press Event. At the time, the game was called Mario & Luigi RPG 3!!!. From there, it was announced in North America and Europe at the E3 2009 event and released in the fall of the same year.

2010–2015: Nintendo 3DS era 
With the introduction of three-dimensional graphics on the Nintendo 3DS, AlphaDream was given the opportunity to change their two-dimensional sprites to 3D ones with the updated hardware. However, Maekawa believed the company not only got very good at designing sprites due to limited graphical capability on prior consoles, but they also helped convey comical expressions, so they were kept. Instead, the backgrounds were fit to 3D. Akira Otani, a producer of the series, considered the animation to be the main reasoning for the extensive development process of Mario & Luigi: Dream Team. He mentioned how it takes up to six people to design the animations for the characters alone.

When it came to Mario & Luigi: Dream Team, the underlying goal was to put emphasis more on Luigi, as Maekawa considered to be lesser in-depth even after his reworking on his character. one of the first ideas for a gimmick suggested was having a large number of Luigis on-screen at one time. Due to advancing hardware, the processing power of such a task would work well. After the idea was determined, they began coming up with ideas where having multiple Luigis would make sense, and they stuck with the game taking place inside a dream. Due to the limitless concept of a dream world, coming up with level ideas was simple.

According to the developers, Mario & Luigi: Paper Jam was created not to make a crossover between the Mario & Luigi and Paper Mario series, but rather to introduce the gimmick of having a third character to control simultaneously. When discussing the third character to control the third set of buttons, it was brought up how two Mario's would be an interesting concept. While developing the game—with supervision from Intelligent Systems, the developers of the Paper Mario series—they were keen not to sacrifice simplicity for extra content, one of the ultimate goals of the Mario & Luigi series. For example, when one of the prototypes of the game that involved rapid and sudden button presses was presented to Shigeru Miyamoto, he directly turned the concept down and asked for it to be simpler.

2016–2019: Remakes and studio closure 
After Paper Jam, AlphaDream began work on remakes of older games in the series. Mario & Luigi: Superstar Saga + Bowser's Minions is a remake of the first game that includes an additional mode, Minion Quest: The Search for Bowser, which follows Captain Goomba and features a real-time strategy battle system. The main reason why Bowser's Inside Story + Bowser Jr.'s Journey was released for the Nintendo 3DS and not the Nintendo Switch was for its use of dual screens, similar to that of the Nintendo DS. In addition, timing reasons led the developers to choose the 3DS as they could easily build upon prior assets instead of creating the title from scratch. Bowser Jr. was the focus of the side story because they wanted to build the parent-child narrative between him and Bowser. They also decided to remake Bowser's Inside Story and skip Partners in Time due to the former being the most successful game in the series.

From 2018 to 2019, AlphaDream began searching for people to hire, including graphic designers and production assistants with the intention of future games for the Nintendo Switch and smartphones. Their most recent Mario & Luigi game, Mario & Luigi: Bowser's Inside Story + Bowser Jr's Journey, was selling poorly and is one of the worst-selling Mario games in Japan to date. Other release plans for the handheld were cancelled because of the low sales, also marking the last Mario game on the console. By March 2018, Yahoo! Japan reported AlphaDream was £3.5 million in debt (US$4.3 million) due to development costs. The company filed for bankruptcy in October 2019. Three months later in January 2020, Nintendo filed a trademark for the series in Argentina, and while most assumed Nintendo was simply protecting their IP, it also lead to speculation that the series would hopefully continue on a later date.

Reception 

All games in the series have received a positive reception. According to Metacritic, the first and third games in the series received "Universal acclaim", while all others received "Generally favourable reviews".

References 

AlphaDream games
 
Nintendo franchises
Video games developed in Japan
Video game franchises introduced in 2003
Video games scored by Yoko Shimomura